Hyunsoonleella rubra is a Gram-negative, aerobic and non-motile bacterium from the genus of Hyunsoonleella which has been isolated from marine sediments from the coast of Weihai.

References 

Flavobacteria
Bacteria described in 2017